Yued  (also spelt Juat, Yuat and Juet) is a region inhabited by the Yued people, one of the fourteen groups of Noongar Aboriginal Australians who have lived in the South West corner of Western Australia for approximately 40,000 years.

European settlers first visited the Yued region in the 17th century, but it was not colonised until George Fletcher Moore’s visit in 1836. In 1846 Spanish Benedictine Monk, Rosendo Salvado created a Catholic missionary institution housing some Yued people, which became New Norcia, the only monastic town in Australia. Later impacts of European colonisation include the introduction of governmental assimilation policies such as the Aborigines Act 1905 which prompted the creation of settlement and internment camps like the Moore River Settlement, contributing to diseases within the Yued population as well as their displacement from the region.

There are ongoing projects to preserve Yued culture including the establishment of native titles, heritage plans and active cultural community programmes.

Language 

At the time of European Settlement, the Yued language was one of the 13 dialects of the Noongar language. The Yued language specifically belongs to Djiralay (northern dialect), one of the three main dialect groups within the wider Noongar region. The other two are Kongal-Boyal (south-eastern dialect) and Kongal-Marawar (south-western dialect).

List of common Noongar words and its different versions in the three dialects 

After colonisation, the number of fluent Yued speakers fell due to cultural assimilation policies which prevented Aboriginal people from practising their native language. As a result, contemporary Yued people speak a dialect of the English language known as Aboriginal English with very few fluent speakers left.

Names 
There is a lack of concrete evidence to support that the endonym for this region was Yued and some sources suggests that it is rather a name used by non-Yued people to refer to the region. However, there is evidence that in the 19th century Aboriginal people living in New Norcia referred to themselves as "Jun-ar", as recorded in the memoir of Rosendo Salvado.

Research suggests that at least some local Noongar people called the Yued region "Minnalyungar" (a general name given by northerners, meaning "Southern People"), and "Jaburu-Jungara" (a Whadjuk name, where Jaburu means "north" by locals). However, in contemporary culture, "Yuat" is used by the local people as self-descriptive name.

Geography 
Under the Yued Native Title agreement, the region starts on the coast of Western Australia and extends inland, encompassing approximately 22,000 square kilometres of land. The towns contained within this region are Leeman, Jurien Bay, Cervantes, Two Rocks, Toodyay, Gingin, Calingiri, Lancelin, Dalwallinu, Coorow and Moora. The official description on the Native Title Agreement of what encompasses the Yued region is as follows: "All those lands and waters commencing at the intersection of the prolongation westerly of the northern boundary of the Shire of Coorow with the 3 Nautical Mile Limit being a point on a present northern boundary of Native Title Determination Application WAD6192/1998 Yued (WC1997/071) and extending generally easterly, generally south easterly, generally south westerly and generally westerly along the boundaries of that native title determination application to the intersection with the 3 Nautical Mile Limit. Then generally north westerly along that 3 Nautical Mile Limit back to the commencement point."

Significant geographical locations 
Multiple geographical sites are classified on the Aboriginal Heritage listing sites under the Yued Indigenous Land user agreement, indicating its importance to the Yued people. See list below.

Examples of heritage listed sites in the Yued region

Flora and fauna 
The Mediterranean to semi-arid climate of the Yued region formed unique flora and fauna that provided sustenance to the Yued people.

Examples of Flora and Fauna used by Yued people:

Culture

Mythological beliefs 

A spirit that is central to the culture of Noongar people, and the Yued people, is the Rainbow Serpent. Whilst the mythological figure is common to many Aboriginal Australian cultures, in Noongar culture this deity is referred to as Waugal (alternatively spelt as Waakal, Waakle, Waagal and Wogal).

The significance of Waugal to the Yued people arise from their belief that the serpent created the Moore River, leading to the river to be referred to as a Dreaming Track. The river was important for many activities of the Yued people, as a meeting, camping and birthing sites. There is common belief that the Waugal permanently resides in the deep river pools in the vicinity of the Moore River

Daily activities

There is evidence to support that the Yued People moved seasonally during the pre-settlement era.  They moved in the springtime, sourcing swamps and estuaries where freshwater turtles, frogs and other fauna provided plentiful food. These swamps and estuaries became a congregation point with the Amangu people during the summer and early autumn months where they camped and traded.
 
The Yued and other Noongar people engaged in trade, an activity which was dictated by the six Noongar Seasons. The common trading place amongst the Noongar people is labelled as the Mandurah (a type of fair or meeting place) which facilitated good exchanges.  The Yued people specialised in providing cutting and fighting tools in the Mandurah. Some of these include the Dowak (a heavy stick used for hunting) and D-Yuna (a stick used during wars)

Social hierarchy 
The Yued Region followed a social hierarchy that included six classes or sections of people, with inheritance determined by the mother's division class.  These classes, which also acted as family names, are:
 Tiraop
 N-Oiognok
 Palarop
 Tondorop
 Mondorop
 Jiragiok

Rules for marriage between classes were specific, with only certain classes being able marry into each other. For an example, individuals could not marry into the same class.

Culture during European settlement 
Whilst cultural assimilation policies such as the taking of the Stolen Generations reduced cultural practices, some Yued people escaped to reserves and river sites where they could maintain elements of traditional lifestyle.  One recorded practice included initiation ceremonies for young boys entering manhood.

European settlement 

The Yued region, like other Aboriginal cultures, underwent cultural shifts following the arrival of Europeans in Australia.  The arrival of four Dutch trading fleets within the vicinity of Moore River between 1656 and 1658 has been identified as the earliest European visit to the Yued region.  However, colonisation did not occur until Irish-born explorer and diarist George Fletcher Moore visited the Garban River in the Yued Region in 1836, later renamed Moore River after him.

Settlers attracted to the Yued region by its fertile land and steady growth of yam fields initially focused their pastoral work around two towns, Moora and Gin Gin, that they established. George Grey, governor of South Australia and New Zealand, noted that the region was a location where "more had been done here to secure a provision from the ground by hard manual labour than I could have believed it in the power of uncivilised man to accomplish". The first permanent settlers arrived in the region in 1846.

During this time, Yued people assisted explorers and settlers who were establishing themselves in Moora and Gingin by providing advice on land cultivation and helping them locate water, with some also finding employment on farming stations.  However, Yued living conditions were soon compromised and they were often displaced from their land into the fringes of towns due to settler-introduced diseases, with many contracting syphilis, bronchitis and cyclical outbreaks of measles.

New Norcia 

In 1845 a Catholic Missionary party led by Rosendo Salvado, a Spanish Benedictine monk, established themselves on the bank of Moore River. Salvado aimed to convert Aboriginal people and equip them with supposedly 'Western' skills like farming without compromising their Indigenous identity. Salvado recruited Yued people from Gin-Gin and Moora, providing them with housing and land to practice farming skills, and hiring some as mission employees. The community developed into the monastic town of New Norcia, a prominent town of the Yued region.

By 1847, some Yued people allowed their children to live with the monks. New Norcia Mission began housing and teaching young boys, as Salvado believed the centre could not cater to girls (a sentiment which was overturned in 1861). The mission gave Indigenous children a structured education, responsibilities through chores, and lessons in sport and musical instruments. To raise funds for the mission, Salvado picked 5 Yued children to take to Europe to showcase the successful conversion of "Native" children to the courts of Europe. By 1858, 92 Aboriginal people (including 26 children) from Moora and Gin Gin resided in the New Norcia community.

Conflicts later arose within the New Norcia community, with Aboriginal residents resenting the lack of care due to the reduction of government subsidies and changing direction of the mission.  In 1911, residents were encouraged to leave the mission, leading to some finding jobs on the outskirts of the Perth metropolitan area and others finding dwellings on the fringes of town.

Fringe dwelling 
Soon, other Yued people joined the residents leaving New Norcia and establishing dwellings in the outskirts of towns such as Moora.

The 1905 Aborigines Act contained legislation to reduce interactions between Aboriginal people and settlers, and many Yued people created dwellings in the outskirts of town, called reserves.  This led to the creation of Karramarra reserve by the state department in 1916. Other well-known reserves include Moora Reserve, Mogumber reserve and Walebing reserve, which became a permanent basis for Yued people after the break-up of Moora Camp in 1920. Due to the high concentration of these reserves near the district of Moora, it was established as the centre of Yued Region by its Aboriginal community. Last names of Aboriginal people who were pioneers of the Moora District include Jackamarra, Taylor, Spratt, Narrier, Anderson, Headland, Yappo, Warrell, Wyatt and Boota.

Living conditions within the camps were poor, with records stating that Aboriginal residents often came into town to beg for food and many townspeople complained about the lack of hygiene and the degree of feuding within these reserves. However, these camps facilitated a means for Yued people to maintain some traditions during times of government forced assimilation.

Development of settlement camps 

In 1915 the Western Australian government established Carrolup settlement as a further instrument of its assimilation policies to segregate Aboriginal people from the wider community. This was followed in 1918 by Moore River settlement camp, constructed near Moore River. This camp held Aboriginal people from other groups residing in the Yued region as the facilities catered for 400 people from Gingin (a major town in Yued region) to Northampton including children from Murchison district.

During the 1960s, general rights and living conditions for Yued people improved due to the repeal of the 1905 Aborigines Act and the closure of settlement camps.  Moora Shire Council approved the erection of transitional homes for Aboriginal families, reducing the need for fringe dwelling.

Unemployment 
During much of the twentieth century the Yued region was characterised by high Aboriginal unemployment rates. Contributory factors included social racism and the strictures of 1905 Aborigines Act, which tried to confine Aboriginal people to the settlement camps, prevent their freedom to find jobs and reduce the land upon which they could farm.

Other factors which increased unemployment included increased competition due to increased immigration from southern Europe, and economic uncertainty created by the Great Depression.  Many Yued people relied on government rations and small payments or 'rewards' collected through conducting menial jobs for settlers such as collecting firewood in return for tobacco. Some also made an income through selling propsticks, a common object traded by Aboriginal people at the time. Records in 1970 show that of 260 Aboriginal people in Moora, only 35 were employed and approximately 100 others were in need of jobs.

Programs to resolve cultural issues 
In 1980s, Yued leaders began to explore the idea of initiating vocational skills classes to resolve unemployment and the lack of cultural cohesion within the Yued community.

In 1985, Yued descendent Wendy Passamani initiated one of the first self-employment schemes for the Yued people in Moora. This course was designed for members to gain skills in spinning wool and using weaving frames and looms to produce textiles. Over time, interest in the program waned and it was shut down.

In 1986, cultural awareness programs in school, especially the St Joseph School were led by Yuat elder, Edward (Ned) Mippy, to reacquaint Yued children with their culture. Activities offered including teaching children the Yued language, recounts of Dreamtime stories and skills in bushcraft, using spears and boomerang.

Yuat artefacts workshop 
In July 1986, the "Yued artefact workshop" was developed by Edward Mippy. This workshop was held in Church Hall and taught adults in the Yued Community to handcraft artefacts such as boomerangs, spears, spear throwers, shields and traditional Yued-style huts called maya-maya. The name for the workshop was officiated as the "Yued Nyoongar Kaat Maya", meaning "Headquarters of the Yued people". The artefacts produced often facilitated monthly celebrations within the Yued community.

Commercial sales of the artefacts were made in local outlets including the Moora Service Station, Walebing Roadhouse and local Arts and Crafts exhibitions. The program received government funding by the Western Australian Department of Employment, Education & Training, and enrolled trainees had an official contract where they worked 20 hours a week in exchange for $150 weekly allowance.

The workshop was officiated in February 1990, with favourable reviews from the general community with an article published saying:"Aborigines in the Wheatbelt town of Moora ... are turning their hand to commerce and in the process discovering talents they did not realise they had. Four hours of classes a day teach them to make various artefacts from the area, including boomerangs, spear throwers, bullroarers, lizards, snakes, didgeridoos and 206 shields which they hope to sell at tourist outlets in and around Perth."Mippy's death in 1992 and a later lack of funding initially left the future of the workshop uncertain. However, government funding revived, leading to a new building being created to facilitate the workshops in 1995. The workshops were praised as a form of cultural and economic empowerment for the Yued people, although they were criticised by some.

Yued (1990 onwards) 

Many more cultural preservation efforts have been initiated since the 1990s.

Aboriginal population according to 2016 census 
According to the 2016 census, the Aboriginal population in the Yued region varied from 2–3% for most towns, with the exception of Moora where 13.4% of the population stated that they were Aboriginal.

Further reading

 Haebich, A. 1988, For their Own Good: Aborigines and Government in the Southwest of Western Australia, 1900 – 1940, Perth, University of Western Australia Press
 Rooney, B. R. (2002). The Legacy of the Late Edward Mippy: An Ethnographic Biography. Centre for Aboriginal Studies. Curtin University
 Salvado, R. (1977). The Salvado memoirs: Historical memoirs of Australia and particularly of the Benedictine mission of New Norcia and of the habits and customs of the Australian natives. University of Western Australia Press

References

Bibliography 
 ‘Aboriginal Craft Centre to Expand,’ Central Districts Gazette, Moora, Western Australia, 11 Jan. 1995: 3.
 Astro Achievements 2019/2020 Snapshot. (2020). Shire of Carnamah. http://www.carnamah.wa.gov.au/library/file/2019-20%20Astrotourism%20Towns%20Achievements.pdf 
 "Assimilation | White Australia Policy | Australians Together". Retrieved 2020-11-17 
 Bunbury, W. 1990, Anybody Could Afford Us, ABC Radio Archives: Social History Unit. Audiocassette, NNA 
 Bureau of Meteorology. (2014). Indigenous Weather Knowledge - The Rainbow Serpent. Retrieved 12 October 2020, from  http://www.bom.gov.au/iwk/climate_culture/culture-belief.shtml
 Cameron, J.M.R. (ed.) 2006, The Millendon Memoirs: George Fletcher Moore's Western Australian Diaries and Letters, 1830–1841, Hesperian Press: Carlisle.
 Callander, D. 1990, ’Crafting a Future from the Bush,’ The West Australian, 22 March: 44.
 Conor, L. (14 August 2018). ‘You don’t belong to my country either.’ How two Noongar boys spoke up, a world away from home. The Conversation. https://theconversation.com/you-dont-belong-to-my-country-either-how-two-noongar-boys-spoke-up-a-world-away-from-home-100458
 Moore River Native Settlement - Summary | Find & Connect. (2019). Find and Connect. https://www.findandconnect.gov.au/guide/wa/WE00948 
 Good. B. Main Roads Western Australia (2017), Aboriginal Heritage Management Plan-Reserve 248 Walebing, Western Australia.  
 Goode, B. G. (July 2018). REPORT OF AN ABORIGINAL HERITAGE SURVEY FOR THE GREAT NORTHERN HIGHWAY: BINDOON BYPASS: IN THE YUED NATIVE TITLE CLAIM AREA. Western Australian Environmental Protection Authority. Retrieved from https://www.epa.wa.gov.au/sites/default/files/PER_documentation2/ApH1_Report%20of%20an%20AHS%20of%20GNH%20Bindoon%20Bypass%20Yued%20FINAL.pdf
 Haebich, A. 1988, For their Own Good: Aborigines and Government in the Southwest of Western Australia, 1900 - 1940, Perth, University of Western Australia Press.
 Headland, J. 1995, Aborigines of Moora: Its People and its Times, Moora
 Kingsley, P. K. (2016). Noongar land, Noongar people: the resilience of Aboriginal culture in the South West of Western Australia. AIATSIS Research Publications.
 Language | Kaartdijin Noongar. (2020). Noongar Culture. https://www.noongarculture.org.au/language/
 Laurie, M. 1995, Tracks through the Midlands: A History of the Moora District, Shire of Moora, Western Australia
 Macquarie Dictionary, Dictionary, M., Thieberger, N., McGregor, W., Dench, A., &     Smythe, S. (2019). Macquarie Aboriginal Words. Macmillan Publishers.
 McConnell, M., McGuire, J. and Moore, G. 1993, Plateau, Plain and Coast, A History of Dandaragan, The Shire of Dandaragan.
 Moore, G. F. (2007). A Descriptive Vocabulary Of The Language In Common Use Amongst The Aborigines Of Western Australia (English and Australian Languages Edition) (Bilingual ed.). Kessinger Publishing, LLC.
 Moore River Native Settlement - Summary | Find & Connect. (2019). Find and Connect. https://www.findandconnect.gov.au/guide/wa/WE00948
 Nannup, A. 1992, When the Pelican laughed, Fremantle Arts Centre Press.
 National Education Standards Authority. (2015). What is Aboriginal English like, and how would you recognise it? Retrieved 12 October 2020, from   https://ab-ed.nesa.nsw.edu.au/go/aboriginal-english/what-is-aboriginal-english-like
 Nayton, G. (2011). The Archaeology of Market Capitalism: A Western Australian Perspective (Contributions To Global Historical Archaeology) (2011th ed.). Springer.
 Ngala Wele Karla (Our Dream on Fire). (2020). Regional Development Australia (RDA) Wheatbelt. https://ngalawelekarla.com.au/about
 Nrm, W. & Wheatbelt NRM. (2018). Ballardong Noongar Dictionary. Wheatbelt NRM.
 Protect and Respect the Yuat Country (2013). Moore to the point newsletter. Retrieved 12 October 2020,   from http://www.moorecatchment.org.au/Newsletters/Issue%2029%20MCC%20newsletterautumn%2013email.pdf
 Rooney, B. R. (2002). The Legacy of the Late Edward Mippy: An Ethnographic Biography. Centre for Aboriginal Studies. Curtin University.
 Rooney, Bernard 2006, ‘An evolving concept of mission: New Norcia 1846–2006’, The Australasian Catholic Record 83: 209–319.
 Salvado, R. (1977). The Salvado memoirs: Historical memoirs of Australia and particularly of the Benedictine mission of New Norcia and of the habits and customs of the Australian natives. University of Western Australia Press.
 Shire of Gingin and the Yued Nyoongar. ND. Cultural Hertigage Management Plan. The shire of Gingin
 South West Aboriginal Land and Sea Council. (2015).   Noongar | Kaartdijin Noongar.  Retrieved 12 October 2020, from https://www.noongarculture.org.au/noongar/ 
 South West Aboriginal Land and Sea Council. (2019). SETTLEMENT AGREEMENT. Retrieved 12 October 2020,   from http://www.noongar.org.au/settlement-agreement
 Strangers on the Shore | Maritime Archaeology Databases. (n.d.). Government of Western Australia. Retrieved 12 November 2020, from http://museum.wa.gov.au/maritime-archaeology-db/strangers-on-the-shore
 Tindale, N. B. (1974). Aboriginal Tribes of Australia: Their Terrain, Environmental Controls, Distribution, Limits and Proper Names (1st ed.). University of California.
 Tomlinson, D (2008). Too white to be regarded as Aborigines: An historical analysis of policies for the protection of Aborigines and the assimilation of Aborigines of mixed descent, and the role of Chief Protectors of Aborigines in the formulation and implementation of those policies, in Western Australia from 1898 to 1940. University of Notre Dame Australia
 Von Brandenstein, C. (1977). Aboriginal Ecological Order in the South-West of Australia — Meaning and Examples. Oceania, 47(3), 169–186. Retrieved 12 October 2020, from http://www.jstor.org/stable/40330292   
 Whitehurst, R. & Noongar Language and Culture Centre. (1990). Noongar Dictionary. Noongar Language and Culture Centre.

Noongar
Wheatbelt (Western Australia)